Yulushevo (Yulış) is a rural locality (a village) in Karmasansky Selsoviet, Ufimsky District, Bashkortostan, Russia. The population was 87 as of 2010. There are 3 streets.

Geography 
Yulushevo is located 48 km northwest of Ufa (the district's administrative centre) by road. Karmasan is the nearest rural locality.

References 

Rural localities in Ufimsky District